Rosa Elena García Echave (born 16 September 1964), known professionally as Rossy de Palma, is a Spanish actress and model. She is well known for her roles in films by Pedro Almodóvar such as Law of Desire, Women on the Verge of a Nervous Breakdown, Kika, The Flower of My Secret, Julieta, and Parallel Mothers.

Life and Career 
Born in Palma de Mallorca, and her father was a mason from Asturias. In the 1980s, during the Movida cultural movement she moved to Madrid. 

In 1984 she founded the pop music group  for which she was a singer and a dancer. In 1986 she met Pedro Almodóvar in a café in Madrid. He was impressed by her performance during one of the group's concerts. He proposed a role in his next film, Law of Desire. Rossy lent some of her personal dresses to Carmen Maura, who was playing the main female character of the film, Tina Quintero. 

Her first major role was in 1988 in Almodóvar's Women on the Verge of a Nervous Breakdown, and she would go on to be one of Almodóvar's recurring cast. She became a model for designers Jean-Paul Gaultier, Thierry Mugler, and Sybilla. She then appeared in Robert Altman's 1994 satirical fashion film Prêt-à-Porter and in the music video of George Michael's "Too Funky" song. 

She has two children and currently lives in Paris, where she acts and models. As of 2010, she is a theater actress, charity spokeswoman for the Ghanaian charity OrphanAid Africa, and the face of luxury ad campaigns. In 2007, she released a perfume line under her name with Etat libre d'Orange. In 2009, she posed nude in an information campaign on breast cancer for the magazine Marie Claire. She was selected to be on the jury for the main competition section of the 2015 Cannes Film Festival.

Theatre

Filmography

Music video

Others 

She is an ambassador for the charity OAfrica, which advocates for a family for every child in Ghana, West Africa, and the closure of illegal orphanages.

In 2018, she collaborated with singer Rosalía for her second studio album El mal querer writing the song "Preso" with her and Ferrán Echegaray. Her vocals were also used in the song.

Danse avec les stars 
In 2011, she was one of the contestants during the first season of Danse avec les stars. With her partner Christophe Licata, she finished in the 7th position (second-to-last).
This table shows the route of Rossy de Palma and Christophe Licata.

References

External links

1964 births
Living people
Spanish television actresses
Spanish film actresses
Spanish expatriates in France
People from Palma de Mallorca
20th-century Spanish actresses
21st-century Spanish actresses
Chicas Almodóvar